Saint-Germain-lès-Arpajon (literally Saint-Germain near Arpajon) is a commune in the Essonne department.

History
 Corbinian founded a religious community in the 7th century
 Up into the 13th century, Saint-Germain was a dependence of the châtellenie of Montlhéry
 In the 16th century, Saint-Germain was an estate of the lords of Granville
 In the 18th century, it was an estate of the lords of Noailles
 In 1720, the commune takes its current name following the acquisition of the commune of Châtres by Louis de Severac, Marquis d' Arpajon-sur-Cère (father of Anne d'Arpajon, comtesse de Noailles). It was previously called Saint-Germain-lès-Châtres).

Population
Its inhabitants are called Germinois.

See also
Communes of the Essonne department

References

External links

Official website 

Mayors of Essonne Association 

Communes of Essonne